Charley's Aunt is a 1925 American silent comedy film directed by Scott Sidney and starring Syd Chaplin, Ethel Shannon, and Lucien Littlefield. It was one of a handful of leading roles for Syd Chaplin, older brother of the more famous Charlie.

It is an adaptation of Brandon Thomas' 1892 farce of the same name about an Oxford University student who dresses up as a woman to fool a visitor. One of several film versions of the play, it was adapted again by Columbia Pictures as a sound film in 1930. The film was a commercial success, grossing over half a million dollars. It was popular in Germany, where it released by the leading film company UFA.

Plot
As described in a review in a film magazine, while on vacation, Fancourt Babberley (Chaplin), known to his friends as Babbs, falls in love with Ela (Shannon) and schemes to help her father (Francis), who has lost heavily at roulette. Babbs sends him away and later learns the truth, starts for England with her chaperon Donna Lucia (Jenson). In the meantime, Babbs friends Jack (James) and Charlie (Harrison), on hearing that Donna, Charley's wealthy aunt from Brazil, will visit him, invite their girls Amy (Akin) and Kitty (Bonner) to a luncheon, hoping to propose to them. Donna does not arrive, and Jack and Charley persuade Babbs to use some stage makeup left over from a college play to pose as Charley's aunt. The situation is then complicated when Spettigue (Page), the guardian of the young women who opposes their love affairs, and Jack's father Sir Francis Chesney (Smalley) show up. Both are interested in Charley's aunt because of her supposed great wealth. In the midst of the exciting situation Donna, the real aunt, appears but conceals her identity. Finally, Babbs gets consent for the young women's marriage by promising to marry Spettigue, and then reveals that he has been masquerading. In the end, all is straightened out and Babbs wins Ela while Donna marries Sir Francis, who was her old sweetheart.

Cast

Preservation
Copies of Charley's Aunt are located in several film archives including the BFI National Archive, George Eastman Museum Motion Picture Collection, and Academy Film Archive.

References

Bibliography
 Donald W. McCaffrey & Christopher P. Jacobs. Guide to the Silent Years of American Cinema. Greenwood Publishing, 1999.

External links

1925 films
1925 comedy films
Silent American comedy films
Films directed by Scott Sidney
American silent feature films
1920s English-language films
Films set in England
Columbia Pictures films
American black-and-white films
1920s American films